Huangshanlong (meaning "Huangshan dragon") is a genus of mamenchisaurid dinosaurs native to the Anhui province of China. It contains a single species, Huangshanlong anhuiensis. H. anhuiensis represents, along with Anhuilong and Wannanosaurus, one of three dinosaurs found in Anhui province.

Discovery and description
The only specimen consists of a partial forelimb discovered in 2002 during the construction of the Huihang Highway. It can be distinguished from other mamenchisaurids in having the following unique combination of  features: such as transverse length  of the proximal end of the humerus is 36% of the total length of the humerus, accessory processes are located near the middle of the cranial edge of the distal  end of the humerus, length of the radius is 58% of that  of the humerus, length of the ulna is two thirds of that of the humerus, craniomedial process  on the proximal end of the ulna is longer than the craniolateral one, and ridges develop on the cranial, caudomedial, and caudolateral faces of  the  distal portion of  the  ulna.

Ren et al. (2018) recover Huangshanlong as sister to Anhuilong and Omeisaurus in a clade within Mamenchisauridae exclusive of other mamenchisaurids.

References

Mamenchisaurids
Middle Jurassic dinosaurs of Asia
Fossil taxa described in 2014
Paleontology in Anhui